The 1997 Paegas Czech Open, also known as the Prague Open, was a men's tennis tournament played on outdoor clay courts at the I. Czech Lawn Tennis Club in Prague, Czech Republic that was part of the World Series of the 1997 ATP Tour. It was the 11th edition of the tournament and was held from 28 April until 4 May 1997. Fourth-seeded Cédric Pioline won the singles title.

Finals

Singles

 Cédric Pioline defeated  Bohdan Ulihrach 6–2, 5–7, 7–6(7–4)
 It was Pioline's 1st singles title of the year and the 2nd of his career.

Doubles

 Mahesh Bhupathi /  Leander Paes defeated  Petr Luxa /  David Škoch 6–1, 6–1

See also
 1997 Skoda Czech Open – women's tournament

References

External links
 ITF tournament edition details

Skoda Czech Open
Prague Open (1987–1999)
1997 in Czech tennis